Pavlos Stamelos (Greek: Παύλος Σταμέλος; born August 2, 1950 in Greece) is a Greek retired professional basketball player and coach. At 6'4" (1.93 m) in height, he played at the power forward and center positions.

Professional club playing career
Stamelos started his club playing career with the junior teams of Sporting Athens in 1964. With Sporting, he was the Greek League Top Scorer in the 1977–78 season. He moved to AEK Athens for the 1979–80 season, where he played until 1981. 

In the top-tier level Greek League, he played in 361 games, and scored a total of 6,645 points, which is the 8th most total points scored in the competition, since the 1963–64 season.

National team playing career
Stamelos played in 53 games with the senior men's Greek national basketball team. With Greece, he played at the 1972 European Olympic Qualification tournament, and at EuroBasket 1973.

Coaching career
After he retired from playing professional basketball, Stamelos worked as a basketball coach, and he coached the junior teams of Sporting.

Awards and accomplishments
Greek League Top Scorer: (1978) 
8th all-time leading scorer of the Greek Basketball Championship, with 6,645 total points scored in the Greek A National League (1963–64 season to present).

References

External links 
FIBA Profile
Hellenic Basketball Federation Player Profile 
Τα “κανόνια” του ελληνικού Πρωταθλήματος: Παύλος Σταμέλος 

1950 births
Living people
AEK B.C. players
Aigaleo B.C. coaches
Centers (basketball)
Greek basketball coaches
Greek Basket League players
Greek men's basketball players
Power forwards (basketball)
Sporting basketball players
Mediterranean Games bronze medalists for Greece
Mediterranean Games medalists in basketball
Competitors at the 1971 Mediterranean Games